Klasterskya is a genus of fungi in the family Ophiostomataceae.

The genus name of Klasterskya is in honour of Ivan Kláštersky (1901-1979), who was a Czechoslovakian botanist, who was between 1925 - 1955 curator, and Director of the botany department of the National Museum (Prague).

The genus was circumscribed by Franz Petrak in Ann. Mycol. vol.38 on page 227 in 1940.

References

External links

Sordariomycetes genera
Ophiostomatales